The white-browed bush robin (Tarsiger indicus) is a species of bird in the family Muscicapidae.
It is found from the Himalayas to south-central China and Taiwan. Its natural habitat is Rhododendron and conifer forests.

The subspecies formosanus, distributed in Taiwan, was described by Ernst Hartert in 1910. It is now proposed to be a full species, the Taiwan bush robin (T. formosanus), in a molecular phylogenetic study published in 2022. It is distinctive in genetics, songs and morphology.

References

white-browed bush robin
Birds of Nepal
Birds of Bhutan
Birds of Northeast India
Birds of China
Birds of Taiwan
Birds of Yunnan
white-browed bush robin
Taxa named by Louis Jean Pierre Vieillot
Taxonomy articles created by Polbot